John Young may refer to John Young, the moonwalking American astronaut, or to:

Academics
 John Young (professor of Greek) (died 1820), Scottish professor of Greek at the University of Glasgow
 John C. Young (pastor) (1803–1857), American educator, pastor, and president of Centre College
 John Dragon Young (1949–1996), Chinese historian
 John Lorenzo Young (1826–1881), English-Australian educationalist
 John Richardson Young (1782–1804), American physiologist

Arts and entertainment

Performing arts
 Harry Anthony (a.k.a. John Young, 1870–1954), American singer
 John Young (actor) (1916–1996), Scottish actor
 John Young (jazz pianist) (1922–2008), American jazz pianist
 John Sacret Young (1946–2021), American author, producer, director, and screenwriter
 John Paul Young (born 1950), Australian singer
 John Bell Young (1953–2017), American concert pianist, music critic and author
 John Young (British musician) (born 1956), British keyboardist and vocalist
 John Young (composer) (born 1962), New Zealand-born composer
 John Lloyd Young (born 1975), American actor and singer
 John G. Young (filmmaker) (fl. 1990s–present), American director, producer and writer

Visual arts
 John Young (engraver) (1755–1825), British mezzotint engraver, keeper of the British Institution
 John Henry Young (1880–1946), Australian art collector, art dealer and art gallery director
 John Chin Young (1909–1997), American  painter
 John Zerunge Young (born 1956), Hong Kong-born Australian artist

Business and industry 
 John Young (agricultural reformer) (1773–1837), Scottish merchant in Nova Scotia
 John Young (architect) (1797–1877), English architect
 John Young (Scottish architect) (1826–1895)
 John Young (building contractor) (1827–1907), Australian building contractor
 John Orr Young (1886–1976), American advertiser
 John Young (brewer) (1921–2006), British chairman of Young's Brewery  
 John A. Young (born 1932), American business manager
 John Young (businessman) (born ca 1948), Australian entrepreneur
 John Hardin Young (a.k.a. Jack Young, fl. 1985–present), American attorney

Military
 John Young (naval officer) (c. 1740–1781), American sailor
 John Preston Young (1847–1934), American Confederate veteran, judge and historian
 John Francis Young (1893–1929), Canadian soldier
 John Darling Young (1910–1988), British Lord Lieutenant of Buckinghamshire
 Yang Kuo-chiang (a.k.a. John K. Young, born 1950) Chinese military leader, Director-General of National Security Bureau of the Republic of China
 John J. Young Jr. (born 1962), U.S. Defense Department official

Politics and law

Australia
 John Young (Australian politician) (1842–1893), New South Wales politician
 John Young (jurist) (1919–2008), Australian jurist
 John Young (judge) (born 1952), Australian jurist in the Federal Court of Australia

Canada
 John Young (seigneur) (c. 1759–1819), Scottish-born Canadian land entrepreneur, jurist, and politician
 John Young (Canadian politician) (1811–1878), member of the Canadian House of Commons
 John Young (Gloucester County, New Brunswick politician) (1841–1907), Canadian politician
 John Young (York County, New Brunswick politician) (1854–1934), Canadian politician
 John Allan Young (1895–1961), Canadian politician in Saskatchewan

U.K.
 John Young (died 1589) (by 1519–1589), English politician, MP
 John Young (MP for Marlborough), (fl. 1559), English politician, MP for Marlborough
 John Young (MP for New Shoreham) (fl. 1586–1597), English politician, MP for New Shoreham, Sussex
 John Young, 1st Baron Lisgar (1807–1876), British diplomat and politician, NSW Governor, Canadian Governor General
 John Young (Scottish politician) (1930–2011), Scottish politician, Member of the Scottish Parliament

U.S.
 John Young (governor) (1802–1852), American politician, Governor of New York
 John Duncan Young (1823–1910), US congressman from Kentucky
 J. Smith Young (1834–1916), American politician
 John Russell Young (DC Commissioner) (1882–1966), 18th president of the Board of Commissioners of the District of Columbia
 John Andrew Young (1916–2002), American politician from Texas
 John M. Young (1926–2010), American politician from Wisconsin
 John Young (Indiana politician), American politician from Indiana

Elsewhere
 John Young (advisor) (c. 1742–1835), British-born government advisor in the Kingdom of Hawaii

Religion 
 John Young (suffragan bishop in London) (1463–1526), English Catholic churchman and academic
 John Young (Regius Professor) (1514–1580), English Catholic clergyman and academic
 John Young (bishop of Rochester) (1532–1605), English academic and Anglican bishop of Rochester
 John Young (Dean of Winchester) (1585–1654), English Calvinist clergyman
 John Young (Bishop of Argyll) (1624–1665), Scottish divine
 John G. Young (bishop) (1746–1813), Irish Catholic bishop
 John F. Young (1820–1885), American Episcopal bishop of Florida, translator of the hymn Silent Night
 John Willard Young (1844–1924), American religious leader
 John Young (Dean of St George's Cathedral) (1914–1991), English Anglican clergyman

Science and medicine 
 John Radford Young (1799–1885), English mathematician, professor and author
 John Young (professor of natural history) (1835–1902), Scottish naturalist, professor of natural history at Glasgow University
 John Stirling Young (1894–1971), Scottish physician, professor of pathology at Aberdeen University
 John Watts Young (1930–2018), American astronaut
 John Wesley Young (1879–1932), American mathematician
 John Zachary Young (1907–1997), English zoologist
 John Young (naturalist) (born c. 1960s), Australian naturalist

Sports

Association football (soccer)
 John Young (footballer, born 1888) (1888–1915), Scottish football player
 John Young (footballer, born 1889) (1889–19??), Scottish association football player
 John Young (footballer, born 1891) (1891–1947), Scottish footballer
 John Young (footballer, born 1951), Scottish association football player and manager
 John Young (footballer, born 1957), Scottish association football player (Denver Avalanche)

Cricket
 John Young (cricketer, born 1863) (1863–1933), English cricketer
 John Young (cricketer, born 1876) (1876–1913), English cricketer
 John Young (cricketer, born 1884) (1884–1960), English cricketer

Other sports
 John Young (pitcher) (fl. 1920s), American Negro league baseball player
 John Young (swimmer) (1917–2006), Bermudian swimmer
 John Young (field hockey) (born 1934), Canadian Olympic field hockey player
 John Young (cyclist) (1936–2013), Australian cyclist
 John Young (rugby union) (1937–2020), English rugby union player
 John Young (first baseman) (1949–2016), American baseball player
 John Young (ice hockey) (born 1969), American ice hockey and roller hockey player

Others 
 John Young (pioneer) (1764–1825), American surveyor
 John Young (abolitionist), (fl. 1800s), American abolitionist and Underground Railroad conductor
 John Russell Young (1840–1899), American writer, diplomat, and Librarian of Congress
 John Preston Young (1847–1934), American Confederate veteran, judge and historian
 John P. Young (1849–1921), American writer and editor of the San Francisco Chronicle
 John Young (police officer) (1888–1952), New Zealand baker, policeman, unionist and police commissioner
 John C. Young (1912–1987), Chinese-American civic leader, key figure in the development of Chinatown, San Francisco
 John Young (Cryptome) (fl. 2000s), American activist and architect

Other uses 
 John Young Parkway, American roadway in Florida
 John W. Young Round Barn, American historic building in Tama County, Iowa
 USS John Young, American warship

See also 
 Jack Young (disambiguation) 
 John Yonge (disambiguation)
 John Young Brown (disambiguation)
 Johnny Young (disambiguation)
 Jonathan Young (disambiguation)
 John Youngs (disambiguation)